Minh Thùy born Trần Thị Thùy (born 23 December 1987), also known to her fans as Búp Bê Quái Vật (Monster Doll) is a Vietnamese singer who won runner-up in Vietnam Idol 2013 on 11 May 2014.

Music career
In 2014, she won runners-up on Vietnam Idol.

On 30 May 2014, she was honored to receive the decision rewards from Quang Tri province because of outstanding achievements in past contests.

References

External links 
Các phần trình diễn của Minh Thùy tại Việt Nam Idol 2013
"Minh Thùy Idol nhận khung bằng khen của Chủ tịch UBND tỉnh Quảng Trị".  soha.vn/ (in Vietnamese). 30 May 2014.

1987 births
Living people
21st-century Vietnamese women singers